The Memorial Tournament is a PGA Tour golf tournament founded in 1976 by Jack Nicklaus. It is played on a Nicklaus-designed course at Muirfield Village Golf Club in Dublin, Ohio, a suburb north of Columbus. The golf course passes through a large neighborhood called Muirfield Village, which includes a 1999 bronze sculpture of Nicklaus mentoring a young golfer located in the wide median of Muirfield Drive.

History
The greater Columbus area is where Jack Nicklaus spent most of his early life. The golf course he designed at Muirfield Village, north of Columbus, was opened in May 1974, and two years later it hosted the first Memorial Tournament.

At the Masters Tournament in 1966, Nicklaus had spoken of his desire to create a tournament that, like The Masters, had a global interest, and was inspired by the history and traditions of the game of golf. He also wanted the tournament to give back in the form of charitable contributions to organizations benefiting needy adults and children throughout Columbus and Ohio. The primary charitable beneficiary of the tournament is Nationwide Children's Hospital.

One of the features of the tournament is a yearly induction ceremony honoring past golfers. A plaque for each honoree is installed near the clubhouse at Muirfield; Nicklaus himself was the 2000 honoree.

Invitational status
The Memorial Tournament is one of only five tournaments given "invitational" status by the PGA Tour, and consequently it has a reduced field of only 120 players (as opposed to most full-field open tournaments with a field of 156 players). The other four tournaments with invitational status are the Arnold Palmer Invitational, the RBC Heritage, Charles Schwab Challenge, and the Genesis Open. Invitational tournaments have smaller fields (between 120 and 132 players), and have more freedom than full-field open tournaments in determining which players are eligible to participate in their event, as invitational tournaments are not required to fill their fields using the PGA Tour Priority Ranking System. Furthermore, unlike full-field open tournaments, invitational tournaments do not offer open qualifying (aka Monday qualifying).

In June 2014, the PGA Tour approved a resolution to grant the winner a three-year exemption, one more than other regular Tour events and on par with winners of the World Golf Championships, The Tour Championship and the Arnold Palmer Invitational.

Field
The field consists of 120 players invited using the following criteria:
 Memorial winners in the last five years or prior to 1997
 The Players Championship and major championship winners in the last five years
 The Tour Championship, World Golf Championships, and Arnold Palmer Invitational winners in the past three years
 Tournament winners in the past year
 Playing member of last named U.S. Ryder Cup team, European Ryder Cup team, U.S. Presidents Cup team, and International Presidents Cup team (non-PGA Tour members qualifying in this category count against unrestricted sponsor exemptions)
 Prior year U.S. Amateur winner
 Prior year British Amateur winner
 Up to four players selected by the tournament from among the money leaders from the other five Federation tours
 14 sponsors exemptions – 2 from among graduates of the Web.com Tour Finals, 6 members not otherwise exempt, and 6 unrestricted
 Top 50 Official World Golf Ranking as of the Friday before the tournament
 Top 70 from prior year's FedEx Cup points list
 PGA Tour members whose non-member FedEx Cup points the previous season (excluding WGCs) would have placed them in the top 70
 Top 70 from current year's FedEx Cup points list as of the Friday before the tournament
 Prior year college player of the year (Jack Nicklaus Award)
 Remaining positions filled alternating from current year's and prior year's FedEx Cup point lists

Tournament highlights
1976: Roger Maltbie won the inaugural Memorial Tournament, defeating Hale Irwin in a four-hole aggregate playoff. On the third extra hole Maltbie's errant approach shot appeared headed for the gallery when it hit a post, causing the ball to bounce onto the green, where both parred to remain tied; Maltbie then birdied the 18th hole to win the playoff.
1977: Poor weather resulted in a Monday finish for the tournament; host Jack Nicklaus won by two shots over Hubert Green.
1980: David Graham birdied the 72nd hole to edge Tom Watson by one shot; Watson was bidding to become the first Memorial champion to defend his title. 
1984: Jack Nicklaus defeated Andy Bean in a sudden-death playoff to become the first two-time Memorial winner.
1991: Kenny Perry won for the first time on the PGA Tour, defeating Irwin on the first hole of a sudden-death playoff.
1993: Paul Azinger birdied the 72nd hole by holing out from a bunker to finish one shot ahead of Corey Pavin.
1994: Tom Lehman shot a tournament record 268 (-20) for 72 holes on his way to a five-shot victory over Greg Norman.
2000: Tiger Woods became the first Memorial winner to successfully defend his title, finishing five shots clear of Ernie Els.
2001: Woods won for a third consecutive year, seven shots ahead of runners-up Paul Azinger and Sergio García.   
2005: Bart Bryant saved par from a hazard on the 72nd hole to win by one shot over Fred Couples.
2007: K. J. Choi shot a final round 65 to win by one shot over Ryan Moore.
2012: Woods birdied three of the last four holes, including a chip in on the 16th hole, to turn a two-shot deficit into a two-shot victory. The win was Woods' 73rd PGA Tour victory, which tied Jack Nicklaus for second most PGA Tour wins.
2013: Defending champion Woods posted a third round back nine score of 44, the worst in his career. He finished 20 shots behind winner Matt Kuchar.
2014: Hideki Matsuyama won in a playoff against Kevin Na; he was the first Japanese PGA Tour winner since 2008.
2015: In the third round, Tiger Woods shot an 85, the worst round of his professional career. Three-time winner Kenny Perry played his last PGA Tour event.
2016: William McGirt won for the first time on the PGA Tour after 165 starts.
2020: Jon Rahm's win elevated him to the world number one ranking for the first time in his career.
2021: Defending champion Jon Rahm held a six-stroke lead after 54 holes but was forced to withdraw after testing positive for COVID-19.

Course layout
Muirfield Village Golf Club in 2016

Source:

Winners and honorees

Note: Green highlight indicates scoring records.
Source:

Multiple winners
Seven men have won the Memorial Tournament more than once through 2021.

5 wins: Tiger Woods (1999, 2000, 2001, 2009, 2012)
3 wins: Kenny Perry (1991, 2003, 2008)
2 wins: Jack Nicklaus (1977, 1984), Hale Irwin (1983, 1985), Greg Norman (1990, 1995), Tom Watson: (1979, 1996), Patrick Cantlay (2019, 2021)

Notes

References

External links

Coverage on the PGA Tour's official site
Nicklaus.com – Muirfield Village Golf Club
Jack Nicklaus Museum
Video Highlights: The 1976 Memorial Tournament at Muirfield Village

PGA Tour events
Golf in Ohio
Sports in Dublin, Ohio
Tourist attractions in Franklin County, Ohio
Recurring sporting events established in 1976
1976 establishments in Ohio
Jack Nicklaus